Constantino Fittante (1 December 1933 – 19 November 2021) was an Italian politician. A member of the Italian Communist Party, he served in the Chamber of Deputies from 1983 to 1987.

References

1933 births
2021 deaths
Italian politicians
Deputies of Legislature IX of Italy
Italian Communist Party politicians
People from the Province of Catanzaro